Jim Foley (19 March 1914 – 14 October 1952) was an Irish footballer.

Foley was capped seven times for the Irish Free State at senior level, between 1934 and 1936. He made his debut in a 4–4 draw with Belgium on 25 February 1934 .

References

External links
 Profile from The Celtic Wiki

Republic of Ireland association footballers
Irish Free State association footballers
Irish Free State international footballers
Celtic F.C. players
1914 births
1952 deaths
Plymouth Argyle F.C. players
Scottish Football League players
English Football League players
Association football goalkeepers